Guy Tzur (born 1962) was chief of the Ground Forces Command of the Israel Defense Forces.

Biography
Guy Tzur was born in Givatayim. In the First Lebanon War in 1982,  Tzur served as  a platoon commander and deputy company commander of an armored battalion. In the Second Lebanon War in 2006, he served as commander of Division 162, an active-duty formation.

References

Israeli generals
Living people
People from Givatayim
1962 births